The 1937 WANFL season was the 53rd season of the Western Australian National Football League. The season saw numerous notable highlights, including:
Five players kicked 100 goals, a number equalled in the major leagues of VFL/AFL, VFA/VFL, or SANFL, only in the 1939 VFA season.
Frank "Scranno" Jenkins won the Sandover Medal in his debut season of senior football with a record high under the 3-2-1 voting system of 34 votes.
In the second round, East Fremantle broke their own 21-year-old record for the highest score in league history.
East Perth drew three games in one season, a feat equalled in major Australian Rules Leagues only by VFA club Moorabbin in 1958 and West Perth in 1960. The Royals could easily have drawn a fourth game but for crowd acclamation preventing umpires from hearing the bell against Subiaco on Foundation Day. No senior Australian Rules team at any level is known to have tied four matches in a season, but Geelong’s Under-19s did so in 1971.
Swan Districts, with Ted Holdsworth kicking at least six goals in each of the first ten games, reached their first finals series in only their fourth WANFL season. Holdsworth was to reach his 100 goals in two fewer games than George Doig took in his 152-goal 1934 season, but concussion and a broken hand eliminated the prospect of a new record.
Claremont, following on from their maiden finals campaign in 1936, won their first minor premiership, but were again beaten in the grand final, leading them to recruit returning West Perth coach Johnny Leonard (who led them to a hat-trick of premierships). East Fremantle, after three unsuccessful finals series, recovered to win their Eighteenth WANFL premiership, whilst Subiaco in falling from third after the 1936 home-and-away season to their first wooden spoon since 1916 with only three victories after the opening round, began thirty years as an almost perennial cellar-dweller.

Off the field, a minor dispute with the Perth City Council over the use of Leederville and Perth Ovals caused a delay in making the fixture list; however unlike what was to happen in 1940 when those grounds were off limits to the WANFL all season the dispute was quickly resolved by a return to the £750 rental fee.

Home-and-away season

Round 1

Round 2

Round 3 (Labour Day)

Round 4

Round 5 (Coronation Day)

Round 6

Round 7

Round 8

Round 9 (Foundation Day)

Round 10

Round 11

Round 12

Round 13

Round 14

Round 15

Round 16

Round 17

Round 18

Round 19

Round 20

Round 21

Ladder

Finals

First semi-final

Second semi-final

Preliminary final

Grand final

Notes
The five were George Doig with 144, Ted Tyson with 124, Frank Hopkins with 120, Ted Holdsworth with 109 and Albert Gook with 107. Bert Chandler of South Fremantle was to score 120 goals in 1938, so that only Subiaco and East Perth of the eight WANFL clubs did not have a century goalkicker in their ranks during this period.The five were George Hawkins (Prahran) with 164, “Soapy” Vallence (Williamstown), Harold Jones (Brunswick), Lance Collins (Coburg) and Laurie Nash (Camberwell) .

References

External links
 Official WAFL site
 Western Australian National Football League (WANFL) 1937

West Australian Football League seasons
WANFL season